Gildo Di Marco (born 20 January 1946) is an Italian actor.

He played Garullo along Fulvio Mingozzi, Werner Peters, Reggie Nalder and Suzy Kendall in L'uccello dalle piume di cristallo (1970), by Dario Argento, postman in Four Flies on Grey Velvet (1971), and Desiderio in Mala tempora, by Stefano Amadio. He appeared in Spaghetti Western films such as Arizona Colt Returns (1970) by Sergio Martino, and Bullet for a Stranger (1971) by Anthony Ascott.

He also appeared in the TV series Door into Darkness.

Filmography
 Ace High (1968) as Henchman Choked by Hutch Bessy (uncredited)
 The 5-Man Army (1969) as Mexican in Back of Carriage (uncredited)
 The Bird with the Crystal Plumage (1970) as Garullo
 Arizona Lets Fly and Kill Everybody (1970) as Filthy Bottle
 Brancaleone at the Crusades (1970)
 Armiamoci e partite! (1971) as Pilota tedesco
 They Call Him Cemetery (1971) as Undertaker
 Trinity Is Still My Name (1971) as Peasant injured by monks
 4 Moscas sobre terciopelo gris (1971) as Postman
 His Name Was Holy Ghost (1972) as Spirito Santo's Men
 The Terror with Cross-Eyes (1972) as Gangster
 Sentían una extraña y excitante peste de dólares (1973)
 La puerta en la oscuridad (1973, TV Series) as Il fornaio
 Un verano para recordar (1974) as Giuseppe

References

Bibliography
 

1946 births
People from Sulmona
Italian male film actors
Italian male television actors
20th-century Italian male actors
Male Spaghetti Western actors
Living people